George Alfred Morrall (1893 – 1964) was an English professional footballer who played as an inside forward.

References

1893 births
1964 deaths
Footballers from Birmingham, West Midlands
English footballers
Association football inside forwards
Nuneaton Borough F.C. players
Hull City A.F.C. players
Grimsby Town F.C. players
Brierley Hill Alliance F.C. players
English Football League players